Tokyo International University (TIU) (東京国際大学, Tōkyō Kokusai Daigaku) is a private, research-oriented liberal arts university and is one of the most international institutions of higher learning in Japan. Founded in 1965, with a focus on business and commerce, the college grew into a private university accredited by the Ministry of Education (MEXT) that now encompasses six undergraduate schools and four graduate schools in the Greater Tokyo Area. TIU also has a sister school relationship with Willamette University (WU), as well as an American campus adjacent to WU's campus (Tokyo International University of America, TIUA) in Salem, Oregon.  

In 2014, TIU opened the English Track Program (E-Track), an English-medium undergraduate degree program providing majors in Business Economics and International Relations. The international student body has since grown to roughly 1,400 students from over 75 countries. At present, approximately one in every eight students at TIU is enrolled in the E-Track degree program.

TIU consistently ranks high in key rankings that measure internationalization and educational quality. Times Higher Education ranked TIU as the third most international university in Japan in 2017, and ninth place in 2018. TIU was also ranked fourth for international environment in the Greater Tokyo Metropolitan Area in 2021. In a study conducted by the Nikkei Career Magazine published in June 2018, TIU received high praise particularly in "strive for educational development" (1st place), "contribution to local economy and society" (2nd place), and "ability to motivate students to succeed" (3rd place).

The main campus of the university is located in Kawagoe City in Saitama Prefecture, Japan, which is a part of the Greater Tokyo Area. Construction of a new international campus in Ikebukuro, one of Tokyo’s major urban hubs, will be completed by September 2023.

History 
The International College of Commerce was established on the site of what is today TIU’s Campus 1 in Kawagoe. 

In 1986, the International College of Commerce was renamed . In 1989, Tokyo International University of America (TIUA), along with an American Studies Program, were established in partnership with Willamette University in Oregon, USA. The one-year program at TIUA and Willamette University enables students to pursue academic goals, while developing intercultural and global awareness. In 2018, the program celebrated its 30th class of students. 

In 2014, TIU launched the English Track (E-Track) Program. This program provides Japanese and international students with bachelor's, master's, and doctoral degrees courses in an all-English curriculum. TIU began to offer new undergraduate IT courses and a new master of science major in Digital Business and Innovation in April 2018. In 2019, the E-Track Alumni Association was established to connect students with E-Track’s growing international network of graduates.

Graduate schools 
Graduate School of Commerce
Graduate School of Clinical Psychology
Graduate School of Economics (English-medium program and Japanese program)
Graduate School of International Relations  (English-medium program and Japanese program)

Undergraduate schools 
Faculty of Commerce
Faculty of Economics
Faculty of Language Communication
Faculty of International Relations
Faculty of Medical and Health
Faculty of Humanities and Social Sciences

Global Campus 
Tokyo International University will establish a new Global Campus in Ikebukuro, one of the busiest hubs of Tokyo where the university's educational globalization efforts will be centralized. The university participated in a bidding process to acquire part of the former Mint Bureau site, which neighbors Sunshine City. TIU's plan won this competition. The land was passed over to the university in October 2020, and the campus facilities are set to open in September 2023.

The English Track Program, as well as other educational globalization functions, will be centralized in this new campus. The university is planning to relocate half of its student body. The plan also includes academics and researchers recruited from around the world, which will further enhance international "brain circulation" in line with Japan's national policy.

 This new campus will be directly linked to the Kawagoe Campus via the Tobu Tojo Line as well as the Tokyo Metro Yurakucho Line, and it will take roughly 30 minutes to travel between campuses.

Institute for International Strategy 
TIU has an affiliated think tank, the Institute for International Strategy. The IIS was founded to conduct interdisciplinary research on issues of strategic international importance from global and Japanese perspectives. It has established an international and local network of researchers and practitioners in the many fields of international affairs - politics, diplomacy and security, business and economics, and public policy. 

TIU professors, who are leading researchers in their respective fields, serve as permanent research fellows within the IIS. The Institute also facilitates visitings scholars from all over the world who are invited to conduct lectures or pursue cutting-edge research in their fields of specialization. 

The Institute’s International Relations faculty host the Global Dialogue visiting speaker series. Recent guest speakers include Daniel R. Russel, former U.S. Assistant Secretary of State for East Asia and Special Assistant to U.S. President Barack Obama, who played a leading role in the U.S.’ Asia pivot strategy.

In 2021, TIU’s IIS became an official collaborating institution of the European Council for Nuclear Research/ Conseil Européen pour la Recherche Nucléaire (CERN)’s Future Circular Collider (FCC) study. TIU is one of only three Japanese institutions collaborating on this project alongside the High Energy Accelerator Research Organization and the University of Tokyo.

Alumni 
Yukio Nakano, Japan Football Association Executive, Founder of Albirex Niigata
Seiichiro Hatori, Japan Business Federation Executive
Naoko Ito, Vice president of Goldman Sachs Japan
Hideo Yokoyama, novelist.
Daisuke Namikawa, voice actor
Kenji Ōtsuki, Musician (Kinniku Shōjo Tai)
Toku, Musician　
Hidenori Iwasaki, composer
Hiroji Miyamoto, Musician (Elephant Kashimashi)
Yasushi Nakano: Psychologist, Professor of University of Tokyo　
Inagaki: Statistician, Professor of Hitotsubashi University
Sachiko Nosaka, Psychologist, associate professor at Osaka University
Ma Xinxin, Economist, associate professor at Kyoto University
Suekawa: President and CEO of Shiseido
Kazunobu Yamada, former Chief human resources officer, Sony

References

External links
Tokyo International University in Japanese 
E-Track Program, Tokyo International University
Institute for International Strategy
Japan Studies Program
Tokyo International University of America

Private universities and colleges in Japan
Private universities and colleges in Oregon
Willamette University
Universities and colleges in Saitama Prefecture
Educational institutions established in 1965
1965 establishments in Japan
Buildings and structures in Kawagoe, Saitama
Tokyo International University